Audrey De Montigny (born July 26, 1985) is a Canadian former singer. She placed fourth on the debut season of Canadian Idol. De Montigny was nominated for a 2005 Juno Award for her eponymous debut album.

Career 
Her career began in 2003, when she auditioned for the 2003 debut season of Canadian Idol. As a Québécoise, she could speak little English, but was praised for her renditions of English songs as she learned quickly during the competition. Her singing and her personality helped her to win a substantial fan base during the competition, and she made it to the top four.

After her stint on Canadian Idol, De Montigny was signed by 19 Entertainment and BMG Music Canada. Her father was her manager, and he sold his home to help his daughter with her career. She released her debut single Même Les Anges on November 4, 2003. The single debuted at No. 2 on the Canadian singles chart and stayed on the chart for 28 weeks. In Quebec, the single was No. 1 for 11 consecutive weeks.

In April 2004 her debut album Audrey which contained a mix of French and English songs (mostly French) was released. She sold 35,000 albums. Her second single Dis-Moi Pourquoi was a top 10 hit in Quebec.  The album was nominated for a 2005 Juno Award in the category Francophone Album of the Year.

De Montigny left BMG and 19E to have more artistic control over her second album. Her family started their own label called DEM Musique.

In June 2006 her debut single "Prends-Moi Comme Je Suis" from her second album Si l'Amour Existe (out September 26, 2006) was released to radio.

De Montigny had her first international success "Here We Are" (2006) in collaboration with musician Steve Barakatt. The single reached number one on the Top Downloads chart in South Korea. The association with Steve Barakatt allowed Audrey de Montigny to release John Lennon's song "Love" for the Amnesty International "Make Some Noise" project.

In 2012 De Montigny released the single "Aujourd'hui Tout Va Changer" which went to number six on the charts followed by the release of a new album Un Seul Instant that fall. The second single from the album "De Toi Je Rêve" peaked at number two on the Francophone charts.

After 2012, she retired from music and transitioned to a full-time career in real estate in Montreal.

Performances on Canadian Idol
"Turn Me On" (Norah Jones) (Audition; Spring 2003)
"How Do I Live" (Trisha Yearwood/LeAnn Rimes) (Toronto Auditions; June 2003)
"Reflection" (Christina Aguilera) (Semi-finals; July 21, 2003)
"Angel" (Sarah McLachlan) (Canadian Hits week; August 4, 2003)
"Mercy Mercy Me" (Marvin Gaye) (Motown week; August 11, 2003)
"Dreamlover" (Mariah Carey) (Summertime Hits week; August 18, 2003)
"The One" (Elton John) (Elton John week; August 25, 2003)
"Turn Me On" (Norah Jones) (Love songs week; September 1, 2003)
"The Greatest Love of All" (Whitney Houston) (Love songs week; September 1, 2003)

Discography

Albums
Audrey (April 2004)
Si L'Amour Existe (September 2006)
Take Me As I Am (December 2006) (Asian Release) (May 2007 – Canadian Release)
Un Seul Instant (October 2012)

Singles
"Même Les Anges" (2003) No. 2 CAN
"Dis-Moi Pourquoi" (2004)
"Don't You Say Goodbye" (2004)
"Prends-Moi Comme Je Suis" (2006)
"Jardin Oublié" (2006)
"Here We Are" (2007 Korean Release)
"Take Me As I Am" (2007 Korean Release)
"Dans Ma Camaro" (2009)
"Aujuord'hui Tout Va Changer" (2012)
"Les Anges Dans Nos Campagnes" (Christmas 2012)
"De Toi Je Rêve" (2013)
 "Le Mal" (2013)

Other
Canadian Idol: Greatest Moments (2003)
Girls Night Out: 3 (2004)
Instant Karma: The Complete Recordings (2007)

References  

1985 births
Living people
People from Lanaudière
French Quebecers
Canadian Idol participants
Singers from Quebec
French-language singers of Canada
Montigny, Audrey De
21st-century Canadian women singers